Clement Gaskin (11 March 1885 – 20 October 1926) was a Guyanese cricketer. He played in one first-class match for British Guiana in 1905/06.

See also
 List of Guyanese representative cricketers

References

External links
 

1885 births
1926 deaths
Guyanese cricketers
Guyana cricketers
Sportspeople from Georgetown, Guyana